Kurkursar-e Olya (also Romanized as Kūrkūrsar-e ‘Olyā; also known as Kerkerūsar-e Bālā and Korkorūdsar-e Bālā) is a village in Kheyrud Kenar Rural District, in the Central District of Nowshahr County, Mazandaran Province, Iran. At the 2006 census, its population was 590, in 159 families.

References 

Populated places in Nowshahr County